"One Day Closer to You" is a song co-written and recorded by Canadian country music artist Carolyn Dawn Johnson.  It was released in July 2002 as the fourth single from the album Room with a View.  The song reached #24 on the Billboard  Hot Country Singles & Tracks chart.  The song was written by Johnson and Mary Danna.

Chart performance

References

2002 singles
2001 songs
Carolyn Dawn Johnson songs
Songs written by Carolyn Dawn Johnson
Song recordings produced by Paul Worley
Arista Nashville singles